Odu may refer to

 Odu (album), a 1998 album by Nigerian musician King Sunny Adé
 Odù, the goddess Àjẹ́
 Odu, shirt name of Nigerian footballer Nnamdi Oduamadi (born 1990)
 Odù Ifá, oracles or literary corpuses of Ifá religion
 O Du people, an aboriginal ethnic group in Vietnam and Laos

See also 
 ODU (disambiguation)
 Odus (disambiguation)